Whanganui District is one of the districts of New Zealand. It includes the city of Whanganui and surrounding areas.

Geography
Formerly spelled "Wanganui", the Whanganui District Council resulted from the amalgamation of Wanganui and Waitotara county councils and Wanganui City Council. The district has an area of 2,373 km². Much of the land in Whanganui District is rough hill country surrounding the valley of the Whanganui River. A large proportion of this is within the Whanganui National Park.

In 2015 the New Zealand Geographic Board, at the request of the Wanganui District Council, changed the name of the district from Wanganui District to Whanganui District, bringing the name in line with the spelling of the river.

Demographics
All but some  people in the Whanganui District live in the city itself, meaning there are few prominent outlying settlements. A small but notable village is Jerusalem.

Whanganui District had a population of 45,309 at the 2018 New Zealand census, an increase of 3,156 people (7.5%) since the 2013 census, and an increase of 2,673 people (6.3%) since the 2006 census. There were 18,057 households. There were 21,912 males and 23,397 females, giving a sex ratio of 0.94 males per female. The median age was 43.0 years (compared with 37.4 years nationally), with 8,937 people (19.7%) aged under 15 years, 7,692 (17.0%) aged 15 to 29, 19,371 (42.8%) aged 30 to 64, and 9,309 (20.5%) aged 65 or older.

Ethnicities were 79.2% European/Pākehā, 26.3% Māori, 3.6% Pacific peoples, 4.1% Asian, and 1.7% other ethnicities. People may identify with more than one ethnicity.

The percentage of people born overseas was 12.3, compared with 27.1% nationally.

Although some people objected to giving their religion, 48.3% had no religion, 37.3% were Christian, 0.6% were Hindu, 0.3% were Muslim, 0.4% were Buddhist and 5.0% had other religions.

Of those at least 15 years old, 5,130 (14.1%) people had a bachelor or higher degree, and 8,427 (23.2%) people had no formal qualifications. The median income was $24,400, compared with $31,800 nationally. 3,300 people (9.1%) earned over $70,000 compared to 17.2% nationally. The employment status of those at least 15 was that 15,159 (41.7%) people were employed full-time, 5,406 (14.9%) were part-time, and 1,866 (5.1%) were unemployed.

References

External links

 Whanganui District Council